Nautic Partners is a private equity firm focused on leveraged buyout investments in middle market companies across a range of industries that includes healthcare, industrial products, and outsourced services.

The firm has AUM of approximately $9.0 billion.

History
The firm, which is based in Providence, Rhode Island, United States, was founded in 1986 as Fleet Equity Partners, a subsidiary of Fleet Bank.  Initially, Fleet Equity Partners invested in private equity exclusively on behalf of the bank.  However, beginning in 1993, the team began to accept outside investors.  In 2000, Nautic Partners was formed as an independent private equity firm with the majority of its capital for its fifth investment vehicle provided by outside investors.  Fleet remained a minority investor.

Among the firm's notable investments are Prince Sports, Fibertech, Big Train Coffee and R2C Group.  The firm was also previously the owner of Skyline Chili. Its healthcare investments include All Metro Health Care, Gaymar and Family Physicians Group. 

In 2015, the firm acquired Source4Teachers, a New Jersey provider of outsourced substitute teacher services.

On May 17, 2017 – Nautic Partners, LLC announced that it has entered into a definitive agreement to acquire, in partnership with management, Endries International, Inc. and certain Endries-related affiliates from Ferguson Enterprises and its affiliates.  The transaction was expected to close within 45 days.

In March 2020, Nautic Partners acquired Harrington Industrial Plastics, in partnership with Harrington management.

References

Down 1 Backer, Nautic Makes Do With Less.  Private Equity Insider, April 2, 2008 
Nautic Partners Sells Medegen to CareFusion.  New York Times, May 19, 2010
Nautic Close to Unloading Contec, Report Says.  New York Times, June 14, 2006

External links
Nautic Partners (company website)

Private equity firms of the United States
Companies based in Rhode Island
American companies established in 1986
Financial services companies established in 1986
Investment banking private equity groups
1986 establishments in Rhode Island